Antarctica Suite (1991) is a composition for orchestra and solo guitar by Australian composer Nigel Westlake, which he adapted as a stand-alone work from his score for the IMAX documentary film Antarctica. The suite was commissioned by ABC for their 60th birthday. It is divided into four movements:
Movement I: Last Place on Earth
Movement II: Wooden Ships
Movement III: Penguin Ballet
Movement IV: Ice Core/Finale

The Antarctica Suite was originally recorded by the Tasmanian Symphony Orchestra with Tim Kain on guitar. The work was voted number 29 in the 2011 Classic 100 Twentieth Century (ABC), number 36 in the Classic 100 Swoon (ABC) in 2015, and 38 in Classic 100 Music For the Screen in 2022.

References 

Orchestral suites
Film music
Australian music
Contemporary classical compositions
1991 compositions
Compositions for symphony orchestra
Compositions for guitar